Hei de Vencer is a 1924 Brazilian silent drama film directed by Luiz de Barros.

Cast
Antonio Sorrentino as  Ernesto Guimarães 
Manuel F. Araujo as Jaime Fonseca 
Laura Munken as Alice 
Adolfo Nery as Guilherme Luiz 
Antonio Tibiriçá as Alberto Junqueira (as Paulo Sullis) 
Célia Cunha as Jaime's lover 
Perle Fabry as Gaby les Fleurs 
Georgette de Lys as Alda Moreira 
César Bresciani   
Reynaldo Gonçalves 
Anésia Pinheiro Machado
Aldo Rine   
João Robba

External links
 

1924 drama films
1924 films
Brazilian black-and-white films
Brazilian silent films
Films directed by Luiz de Barros
Brazilian drama films
Silent drama films